Koné Airport  is an airport serving Koné, a commune in the North Province of New Caledonia, an overseas territory (territoire d'outre-mer) of France in the Pacific Ocean.

Airlines and destinations

References

External links
 

Airports in New Caledonia